At the Mall is the first album from one-man Hip hop/Disco/Electronica act Baron Zen, released on Stones Throw Records in 2006.

Track listing
 "Baron Zen Theme"
 "No More"
 "Walked in Line"
 "Fuckin' Bored"
 "Shoes"
 "Turn Around"
 "Night in Jail"
 "Last Night"
 "When I Hear Music"
 "Gotta Get Rid of Rick"
 "At the Mall"
 "Money"
 "Walking on Sunshine"
 "Burn Rubber"

References

External links 
 Baron Zen on Stones Throw
 Stones Throw official site

Stones Throw Records albums
2006 albums